Alinjeh may refer to:
 Alinjeh, East Azerbaijan
 Alinjeh, Zanjan

See also
 Alenjeh